Scaevola taccada, also known as beach cabbage, sea lettuce, or beach naupaka, is a flowering plant in the family Goodeniaceae found in coastal locations in the tropical areas of the Indo-Pacific. It is a common beach shrub throughout the Arabian Sea, the tropical Indian Ocean and the tropical islands of the Pacific Ocean.

There has long been confusion over the correct scientific name for this species. It is also known by the synonym Scaevola sericea.

Description
Scaevola taccada is a large bush reaching up to about 4 m in height typical of littoral zones where it grows very close to the sea exposed to the salt spray, usually on sandy or pebbly soils. Leaves are slightly succulent, about 20 cm long, closely alternate and crowded at the stem tips. They are glabrous with a fleshy-looking yellowish green color. The fruits and flowers are white. Scaevola taccada blooms the whole year round and the flowers have a fan-like shape which gives them the name fanflower or half flower. The fruits float in seawater and are propagated by ocean currents, this bush being one of the pioneer plants in new sandbanks in tropical areas.

Scaevola taccada is similar to Scaevola plumieri – both were included in the original circumscription of the species. S. taccada has evident calyx lobes and white fruit on which the calyx lobes persist. S. plumieri has short or absent lobes on its calyx and black fruit when ripe.

Taxonomy
Two shrubby Scaevola species occur along the coasts of tropical and subtropical regions of the world. They sometimes occur in the same region, but one is more western, reaching Atlantic coasts, and one more eastern, reaching out into the Pacific. Carl Linnaeus initially included both species in his Lobelia plumieri, which he later considered to be the sole species in his new genus Scaevola (although the combination Scaevola plumieri was first published by Martin Vahl). There has been confusion for many years over the correct name of the two species when they are recognized as distinct. Scaevola plumieri (L.) Vahl is now used as the name for the western species.

The earliest name now recognized as applying to the eastern species, Lobelia taccada, was published by Joseph Gaertner in 1788. William Roxburgh indirectly referred to this name when transferring it to the genus Scaevola in 1788. Separately, and later, Martin Vahl described Scaevola sericea in 1791, based on a specimen from Niue, a small island in the south Pacific Ocean. In 1980, Jeffrey argued that the correct name for the species was Scaevola sericea, since Roxburgh's transfer was not acceptable under the nomenclature code. However, Green in 1991 considered that Jeffrey was mistaken, the transfer being valid, so that the correct name for the eastern species was Scaevola taccada, the name used, for example, by the online Flora of China. The International Plant Names Index accepts this analysis.

Distribution
The species is found in coastal areas and beaches of Okinawa, Taiwan, Southern China, Vietnam, Malaysia, Philippines, Indonesia, East Timor, Northern Australia, Polynesia, Melanesia, Micronesia, East Africa, Madagascar, Mauritius, Seychelles, Oman, Yemen, India, Maldives, Burma, Thailand, Cambodia, Chagos Islands, Comoros, and Réunion.

In the United States (Florida, Puerto Rico, US Virgin Islands) as well as many other Caribbean nations and the Bahamas, Scaevola taccada has become an invasive species, pushing away the native Caribbean Scaevola plumieri species from its native habitat.

Habitat

Scaevola taccada typically grows directly on the beaches of tropical coasts with a preference for beach crests on coral sands. It grows within the salt spray area and it is amongst the first pioneer plant colonisers on tropical atolls and sandbanks. Besides seeds, it is easily propagated from cuttings.

It prefers well drained sandy soils and it is a very salt tolerant scrub. Scaevola taccada is sometimes found growing in loose plant communities with coconut palms, soldierbush, beach morning glory, beach gardenia, several pandanus species, beach calophyllum followed by portia tree, sea almond, beach hibiscus, Cordia subcordata and others. The plant is often featured prominently on tropical island postcards and wallpapers.

Use
In some islands of the Pacific, Scaevola taccada is used to prevent coastal erosion as well as for landscaping. It is also planted on the beach crests to protect other cultivated plants from the salt spray. Parts of the plant are also used in Polynesian and Asian traditional medicine. Drops from the plant were used in cases of eye irritation by Chamorro breath-hold spearfishermen in the Mariana Islands. Historically in the Maldives the leaves of this plant were often used as famine food.

Gallery

References

External links
Scaevola sericea occurrence data from GBIF
Merambong or Sea lettuce - Scaevola taccada

taccada
Flora of Hawaii
Flora of Queensland
Asterales of Australia
Flora of tropical Asia
Flora of Oman
Flora of Tanzania
Leaf vegetables
Flora of the Coral Sea Islands Territory